Jitesh Singh Deo (born May 29, 1995), also known as JD, is an Indian actor, entrepreneur, model and a beauty pageant titleholder who won Mr. India 2017.

Early life and career

Jitesh was born in Lucknow, Uttar Pradesh, India and shifted to Mumbai for his career. He is an actor, civil engineer and a model by profession. He did his schooling from City Montessori School, Lucknow and graduated from Inderprastha Engineering College, Ghaziabad.
He was crowned Mister India by the outgoing titleholder Vishnu Raj Menon on 14 December 2017 in Mumbai.

References

External links
 

Living people
Indian male models
Male actors from Lucknow
Indian male television actors
Indian beauty pageant winners
Beauty pageant contestants from India
1993 births